Frederick G. Strickland was a 19th-century American Christian socialist. Strickland believed in social service as a method of redefining the Christian religion, as a method of "Social Redemption", under the presumption that it could become the "most evangelical religion". He would lecture at colleges to express his views, with at least the Religious Association of Defiance College being one.

References

19th-century Anabaptists
American Anabaptists
American Christian socialists
Anabaptist socialists